The 2019 Overwatch League playoffs were the postseason tournament of the 2019 Overwatch League regular season, beginning on September 5, and concluded with the 2019 Grand Finals, the second championship match of the Overwatch League (OWL), on September 29.

Eight teams competed in the OWL Playoffs – a double-elimination tournament. The winner of each round of the Playoffs were determined by a single-match, where each match winner was determined by which team wins four maps. The final two teams remaining in the tournament advanced to the Grand Finals, which took place at Wells Fargo Center in Philadelphia, Pennsylvania.

The defending OWL champions were the London Spitfire, who won the title against the Philadelphia Fusion in the 2018 OWL Grand Finals, but they fell in the first round of the lower bracket. The San Francisco Shock defeated the Vancouver Titans in the finals to claim their first OWL Championship.

Map pool 
The postseason map pool consisted of twelve maps evenly distributed across the four map types.

Participants 
Eight teams qualified for the Season Playoffs. The two division leaders from the regular season were awarded the top two seeds, the following top four teams, based on regular season standings, were awarded seeds three through six, and the top two teams from the Play-In Tournament were awarded seeds seven and eight.

Bracket

Matches

First Round

Losers Round 1

Winners Round 1

Losers Round 2

Winners Round 2

Losers Round 3

Losers Round 4

Grand Finals

Winnings 

Broadcast and viewership 
All matches of the playoffs were live-streamed on Twitch, the Overwatch League website, and the ESPN app.

Telecast schedule 

Source:

References 

Overwatch
Playoffs